The phonology of Quebec French is more complex than that of Parisian or Continental French. The latter of each pair has disappeared in Parisian French, and only the last distinction has been maintained in Meridional French, yet all of these distinctions persist in Suisse Romande.

Vowels

In some areas, notably Beauce, Saguenay–Lac-Saint-Jean, and (to a lesser extent) Quebec City and the surrounding area, even long tense vowels may be laxed.

Such phenomena are conditioned lexically and regionally.

There are some exceptions; the words la, ma, ta, sa, fa, papa and caca are always pronounced with the phoneme . Otherwise, there are many words which are pronounced with the long , even though there is no circumflex: sable, espace, psychiatre, miracle, mardi and as (noun), etc. There are some words which are pronounced with the short , even though there is a circumflex; they are exceptions: câlin and bâbord, etc. Some words are pronounced differently in different regions; for example, the words lacet, nage and crabe are exceptions: they are pronounced with the short  in Eastern Quebec, but with the long  in Western Quebec.

Also, there are many words which are pronounced with the long , even though there is no circumflex: aide, presse, cesse, caisse, graisse, sirène, scène, palmarès, etc. There are a few exceptions, which are pronounced with the short  phoneme, even though there is a circumflex; they are exceptions: êtes, bêche, extrême, suprême, pimbêche, prête (adjective), etc. Some words are pronounced differently in different regions; for example, the words arrête, haleine and baleine are exceptions: they are pronounced with the short  in Eastern Quebec, but with the long  in Western Quebec.

In modern Quebec French, the  phoneme is only used in loanwords: cheap.

In Quebec French, the phoneme  is only used in loanwords: cool.

The ⟨oî⟩ spelling is phonemically . It is phonetically  in formal speech, but it can also be pronounced in some additional different ways in joual (boîte 'box' ). Also, there are many words which are pronounced with the long , even though there is no circumflex: coiffe, croissant, soirée and poivre, etc.

Another informal archaic trait from 17th-century Parisian popular French is the tendency to open  into  in a final open syllable. However, Quebecers usually pronounce  when they are reading.

Nasal vowels

Diphthongization
  → , but  before , as in fête , Eng. "party"; père , Eng. "father"; fêter , Eng. "celebrate";
  → , as in neutre , Eng. "neutral"
  → , as in cause , Eng. "cause"
  → , but  (before ), as in pâte , Eng. "paste" bar , Eng. "bar"
  →  (only before ), as in bord , Eng. "side"
  →  (only before ), as in cœur , Eng. "heart"
  → , as in livre , Eng. "book/pound"
  → , as in four , Eng. "oven"
  → , as in cure , Eng. "treatment"
  → , as in banque , Eng. "bank"
  → , as in quinze , Eng. "fifteen"
  → , as in son , Eng. "sound"
  → , as in un , Eng. "one"
  → , as in boîte , Eng. "box"

Phonological feminine

Metonymies provide interesting evidence of a phonological feminine. For instance, although most adults would probably say that autobus is masculine if they were given time to think, specific bus routes defined by their number are always feminine. Bus No. 10 is known as l'autobus 10, or more often la 10. Using le 10 in such a context, although it is normal in France, would be strikingly odd in Quebec (especially Montreal) except in some regions, particularly the Outaouais, where it is usual. (An alternative explanation, however, is that bus routes in Montreal are called "lines" and so la 10 is short for la ligne 10, not l'autobus 10 since it is the route that is being referred to, not an individual bus.)

There are many grammatical differences in informal speech. For instance, some words have a different gender from standard French (une job, rather than un job). That is partially systematic; just as the difference in pronunciation between chien  (masc.) and chienne  (fem.) is the presence or absence of a final consonant, ambiguous words ending in a consonant (such as job) are often considered to be feminine.

Also, vowel-initial words that in standard grammar are masculine are sometimes considered to be feminine, as preceding masculine adjectives are homophonous to feminine adjectives (un bel avion; bel  = belle fem.): the word is considered to be feminine (une belle avion). Another explanation would be that many other words ending in -ion are feminine (nation, élection, mission, etc.) and that the grammatical gender of avion is made to conform to this pattern, but the number of -ion words that are masculine, particularly concrete nouns like avion (lion, pion, camion, lampion, etc.), as opposed to abstract -tion nouns, weakens that explanation.

Consonants

Around 12 different rhotics are used in Quebec, depending on region, age and education among other things. The uvular trill  has lately been emerging as a provincial standard, and the alveolar trill  was used in informal speech in Montreal. In modern Quebec French, the voiced uvular fricative  (but it becomes voiceless before voiceless consonants and after voiceless consonants ) is more common.

The velar nasal  is found in loanwords (ping-pong ), but is often found as an allophone of the palatal nasal , the word ligne 'line' may be pronounced .

That is particularly found in the Beauce region to the point where the pronunciation is frequently stereotyped, but it can be found throughout Quebec as well as other French-speaking areas in Canada.

Depending on the speaker, the fricative may be more or less strong or sometimes even assimilate the stop in informal speech. For example, constitution could have any of the following pronunciations:   →  → .

In Joual, some instances of final mute t may be pronounced:
lit  → .
There is also the special case of "debout"  'standing up' and "ici"  'here' (sometimes actually written icitte). On the other hand, the t in but 'goal' and août 'August' are not pronounced in Quebec, but they are pronounced in France (decreasingly for but). They often reflect centuries-old variation or constitute archaisms.

Many of the features of Quebec French are mistakenly attributed to English influence; however, the historical evidence shows that most of them either descend from earlier forms from specific dialects and are forms that have since changed in France or internal developments (changes that have occurred in Canada alone but not necessarily in all parts).

Consonant reduction
It has been postulated that the frequency of consonant reduction in Quebec French is due to a tendency to pronounce vowels with more "strength" than consonants, a pattern reversing that of European French.

Consonant clusters finishing a word are reduced, often losing altogether the last or two last consonants, in both formal and informal Quebec French.

The phone  in article determiners and even more in personal pronouns in most dialects does not exist in the mental representation of these words. Elle is further modified into  in informal speech, a sound change similar to that of  into  before .

In colloquial speech, the combination of the preposition sur + definite article is often abbreviated: sur + le = su'l; sur + la = su'a or sa; sur + les = ses. Sometimes dans + un and dans + les is abbreviated to just dun and dins. In the informal French of France, sur + le also becomes su'l, such as L'dimanche, i'est su'l pont dès 8 heures du mat ('On Sundays, he's hard at work from 8 am'). No other contractions are used.

Some initial consonants are also reduced:  gueule (France), especially in the construction ta gueule  "shut up". Many Québécois even write gueule as yeule.

Aspiration of voiceless plosives

In spoken Standard French, /k/, /p/ and /t/ are by and large regarded as unaspirated. However, in Quebec's (and certain other Canadian) variants of spoken French, aspiration in those consonants is quite common. The voice onset time of the afore-mentioned sounds produced by Québécoise francophones is, to some extent, longer than that of their French counterparts, meaning that they are often categorized as aspirated.

Combinatory phenomena

Vowel harmonization and consonant assimilation
The high front vowels in Quebec French show a net tendency to be unvoiced or even lost, as in municipalité  → , .

Much more common is the nasalization of some long vowels placed before a nasal consonant: même  →  ~ , jeûne  → , jaune  → , etc.

Similarly, consonants in clusters are often assimilated, usually with the consonant closer to the stress (the end of the word), which transmits its phonation (or its nasalization): demande  → , chaque jour  → .

For instance, the first-person singular pronoun "je" may be devoiced before a verb with a voiceless consonant initial.

One extreme instance of assimilation in Quebec French is vocalic fusion, which is associated with informal speech and fast speech and consonant elisions. Vocalic fusion can be either total (as in prepositional determiners sur la  →  → , dans la  →  → , and dans les  → ) or partial (as in il lui a dit,  →  →  →  or ). Partial fusion can occur also in slow speech.

Liaison
Liaison is a phenomenon in spoken French in which an otherwise-silent final consonant is pronounced at the beginning of a following word beginning with a vowel. The rules for liaison are complex in both European French and Quebec French.

Sample passage

From Les insolences du Frère Untel (1960), by Jean-Paul Desbiens, p. 27.

References

Bibliography

Further reading

See also
French orthography

Phonology
French phonology